Gregoria Micaela Toledo Machín (born 24 September 1969 in Arrecife, Lanzarote), professionally known as Goya Toledo, is a Spanish actress and model. She has appeared in Amores Perros, Killing Words and 13 Roses.

Before venturing into acting, Toledo had worked as a model. She made her debut in 1993, and has since performed in Spanish, Italian and German productions. At the 13th Goya Awards, Toledo was nominated for Best New Actress for her performance in Mararía. In 2003, at the 53rd Berlin International Film Festival, she was one of several young European actors that were presented Shooting Stars Award by the European Film Promotion.

Personal life 
Toledo is a close friend of fellow Spanish actress Penélope Cruz, whom she met while studying acting in the school of Cristina Rota. In 2015, she confirmed her marriage to guitarist Craig Ross.

Filmography

Awards and nominations

References

External links 
 

1969 births
Living people
People from Arrecife
Actresses from the Canary Islands
Spanish female models
Spanish film actresses
Spanish television actresses
20th-century Spanish actresses
21st-century Spanish actresses